Trump Model Management, later shortened to T Management, was a New York City-based modeling agency founded by Donald Trump as T Models in 1999. It was closed by Trump in April 2017, shortly after he became U.S. president.

History
In October 2014, Trump Model Management was sued by model Alexia Palmer.  Palmer alleged that 80% of her wages were taken away from her as "expenses" and that she had been paid less than $4000 over a two-year period. The lawsuit was dismissed in March 2016.

In July 2015, it was reported that Trump Model Management and Trump Management Group LLC combined had requested US visas for almost 250 international fashion models.
 
In August 2016, former Trump models alleged that they had worked for the agency without the company having obtained proper work visas on their behalf.

In September 2016, Senator Barbara Boxer called on United States Citizenship and Immigration Services to investigate the allegations.

In April 2017, after Trump was inaugurated as U.S president, it was announced that the agency would be closed down.

Represented models (past)

 Carol Alt
 Rachel Blais
 Alyssa Campanella
 Agbani Darego
 Carmen Dell'Orefice
 Irene Esser
 Rila Fukushima
 Karina González
 Tricia Helfer
 Danielle Herrington
 Paris Hilton
 Kiara Kabukuru
 Mia Kang
 Jodie Kidd
 Hannelore Knuts
 Yasmin Le Bon
 Ali MacGraw
 Shirley Mallmann
 Eugenia Mandzhieva
 Claudia Mason
 Elena Melnik
 Dayana Mendoza
 Katie Moore
 Ximena Navarrete
 Hye-rim Park
 Tatjana Patitz
 Rozanna Purcell
 Isabella Rossellini
 Hollie-May Saker
 Ève Salvail
 Mirjeta Shala
 Alyona Subbotina
 Siri Tollerod
 Melania Trump
 Brittany Woodward
 Kara Young
 Paulina Vega

See also
List of things named after Donald Trump
 List of modeling agencies

References

External links

Assets owned by the Trump Organization
Entertainment companies established in 1999
Entertainment companies based in New York City
Modeling agencies
1999 establishments in New York City